Sint-Andries is a suburb of Bruges in the province of West Flanders in Belgium.

The Jan Breydel Stadium, where the football teams Club Brugge and Cercle Brugge play, is situated in Sint-Andries.
There are also a lot of small castles, built by the nobility in the late 19th century, mostly in woody	environments. It contains St. Andrew's Abbey, established in 1100.

External links
www.brugge.be

Sub-municipalities of Bruges
Populated places in West Flanders